This is a list of notable converts to Christianity from Confucianism. It is debated whether Confucianism is a religion and some Confucians who became Christians considered themselves to remain Confucian in philosophy.

References

 Confucianism
Christianity from Confucianism